Bartha is a Hungarian name.  People with the name include:

Given name
Bartha Knoppers (born 1951), Canadian lawyer 
Bartha van Crimpen (1754–1818), Dutch patriot

Surname
Albert Bartha (1877–1960), Hungarian military officer and politician
Andrea Bartha, Hungarian visual artist, set and costume designer
Aranka Szabó-Bartha (1926–2018), Hungarian sprinter 
Ferenc Bartha (1943–2012), Hungarian economist
Zoltán Sulkowsky and Gyula Bartha (born c. 1904–1905), Hungarian long-distance motorcycle riders 
John Bartha (1915–1991), Hungarian film actor 
Justin Bartha (born 1978), American actor 
Károly Bartha (1884–1964), Hungarian military officer and politician
 Károly Bartha (swimmer) (1907–1991), Hungarian swimmer who competed in the 1924 Summer Olympics
László Bartha (disambiguation), multiple people
Rezső von Bartha (1912–2001), Hungarian fencer and modern pentathlete 
Richard Bartha, Hungarian-born American microbiologist

See also
Baingan bharta

Hungarian-language surnames